Grounds for Coffee is a locally owned cooperative of coffee shop owners operating in Utah. The first Grounds for Coffee shop opened in Salt Lake City in 1989. The business currently operates as a franchise owned by Dan and Suzy Dailey, with multiple shops located in Ogden, Layton, and Sunset, Utah. One independently owned shop also operates under the Grounds for Coffee name in Clearfield, Utah. Grounds for Coffee also operates a mail-order business via its website, selling fresh roasted coffee beans.

History 
Grounds for Coffee opened its first location approximately 1989 adjacent to Liberty Park in Salt Lake City. The original owners (Bendt and Sandra Johnson) operated as a licensed retail coffee business and roaster. By the early 1990s they had nine separately owned and operated locations mostly in Salt Lake City, with a shop in both Ogden and Clearfield which carried their name, drink recipes, and line of roasted coffee beans. By the mid- to late 90s the Johnsons closed the roasting operation and left Utah. This left each existing shop to operate as an individual location. One by one they mostly closed with the exception of the shop at 3005 Harrison Blvd., Ogden owned and operated by Dan & Suzy Dailey and the Clearfield shop owned and operated by Pam McLaughlin at 375 South State St. (Lakeside Square), in Clearfield. It was at this point in time that Dan and Suzy Dailey acquired the trademarked logo and Grounds for Coffee name. They restructured the operation from a licensed business to a franchise. With only the two existing locations, Pam McLaughlin was invited but declined the offer to operate under the new franchise. She continues to operate independently from, and amicably with, the Daileys today.

In 1991, Grounds for Coffee had a coffee shop at 4881 South Redwood Road in Salt Lake City owned by Lew and Holly, which is now the location of another coffee house called Hidden Peaks Gourmet, located a few blocks from the Salt Lake Community College.

In 1996, Grounds for Coffee experimented with setting up a "Cappucino Corner" located on the Salt Lake Community College campus on Redwood Road.

Locations 
As of April 2015 eight coffee shops operate under the Grounds for Coffee franchise. They are:
 3005 Harrison Blvd., Ogden UT 84403, opened by Dan & Suzy Dailey on January 15, 1992
 1480 Hwy. 89, Layton UT 84404, opened by Jennifer Zeemer in 2000 and purchased by Tim & Teri Ohrenberger in 2009. It was then sold to Taylour Campbell in 2017.
 111 Historic 25th Street, Ogden UT 84401, opened in 2004 By Dan & Suzy Dailey and taken over operationally by Sadie Clifford in 2009. This location includes a Bake Shop
 McKay-Dee Hospital Center, Ogden UT coffee kiosk opened by Dan and Suzy Dailey in the original hospital site in 1999 and relocated to the new hospital in 2002
 4101 Riverdale Rd, Riverdale UT 84405 opened by Sadie Clifford Gleave in October 2012, this location closed in August 2015
 2853 North Main St. Sunset UT opened by Dan & Suzy Dailey in January 2014
 Ogden Regional Medical Center UT opened by Sadie Clifford in December 2015
 157 North Commercial St. Morgan UT opened by Adam & Shauna Walker in March 2016
Grounds for Coffee franchised locations include full service, sit down coffee shops, drive-thrus, and a scaled down kiosk model. Each are independently owned and operated. The franchise does not operate with a top-down oriented chain of command. Each shop owner makes decision regarding interiors, product line, peripheral products, hours, and pricing. The unifying and consistent attributes of each shop are: the coffee & espresso based drink menu, ingredients and recipes, and an emphasis on customer service and community integration. Every GFC location appears as a local, independent business reflecting the tastes and preferences of the unique market place and clientele. GFC is a strong supporter of the Buy Local movement. Every shop participates in many community related events and fundraisers. Like all locally owned independent businesses the monies spent and tax dollars collected stay within the local economies they serve.

Honors 
In October 2012, Indie Ogden in Utah awarded Grounds for Coffee as the Best Local Coffee.

Community 
Grounds for Coffee is known for its community presence, sponsoring and partnering with many local businesses and events. The 30th and Harrison location regularly held shows by artists' work from Weber State University. There was an occasion however in 1994, where the management at that time had determined that the subject matter was too offensive for some patrons, and remove those which contained paintings and photographs of nudity.

On "Make a Difference Day" held on May 12, 2011, and also on May 10, 2012 included notable partners the McKay-Dee Hospital Center, the LDS Church, the Ogden School District, the Ogden Nature Center, the Utah Transit Authority, the YMCA, the Utah Division of Juvenile Justice Services and the Keller Williams Realty. It is a member of Local First Utah, a network of many local businesses and non-profits that emphasizes the importance of buying local products.

In 2014, the Clearfield location participated in their first "Coffee with a Cop" meeting, giving the citizens a chance to find out what is happening with the local police department, and provide some feedback as well.

See also
 List of coffeehouse chains

References

External links
 

Coffeehouses and cafés in the United States
Restaurants established in 1989
Companies based in Ogden, Utah
1989 establishments in Utah